ASUSTeK Computer Incorporated (Asus) manufactures a series of network routers directly competing with Linksys routers from Belkin.

The Asus series of routers usually ship with Broadcom chipsets, faster processors and more memory than average, removable antennas, and USB ports for expansion. Although Asus' factory default firmware is generally more feature-rich than its competitors, Open source Linux-based router firmware projects such as DD-WRT, OpenWrt, Tomato Firmware and DebWRT are able to get better performance out of the devices and offer their users more flexibility and customization options.  Asus encourages and supports this use and advertises several routers as particularly suitable for DD-WRT  including especially the RT-N16 gigabit router.  See details on compatibility below.  The RT-N13U/B, RT-N12, RT-N10+, WL-520GU and WL-520GC are also advertised as DD-WRT compatible though do not ship with this operating system.

ASUS Wireless b Routers

ASUS Wireless g Routers

ASUS Wireless n Routers

ASUS Wireless ac Routers

ASUS Wireless ax Routers

See also
 List of wireless router firmware projects

References

External links 
ASUS

Routers
Hardware routers
Wireless networking hardware
Linux-based devices